The 2019 Missouri Valley Conference men's soccer tournament was the 30th edition of the competition. The tournament was played from November 13 until November 17, 2019.

Loyola Chicago won their first MVC championship, beating regular season champions, Missouri State, in the final.

Background 

The 2019 Missouri Valley Conference Men's Soccer Tournament is the culmination of the regular season. The regular season conference matches determine the seeding in the tournament, which determines the conference's automatic berth into the NCAA Tournament. All teams in the Missouri Valley Conference, or MVC, play each other once during the season. Teams play certain teams at home during even number years, and then will play those teams on the road during odd number years. Teams are awarded three points for a win, a point for a draw and no points for a loss.

In the event that teams are tied on points, the first tiebreaker is head-to-head record. If that tiebreaker is tied, goal differential is applied, followed by goals scored, then away goals, then RPI.

Missouri State won the regular season with a perfect 10–0–0 record, the first time a MVC program had won all 10 conference games in MVC history. Both programs earned a berth into the NCAA Tournament. Loyola Chicago lost in overtime to Kentucky in the opening round. Missouri State defeated Denver in the first round before losing to UCF in the second round.

Seeding

Bracket

Results

Quarterfinals

Semifinals

Final

All-Tournament team

References

External links 
2019 MVC Men's Soccer Championship Central

2019
Missouri Valley Conference Men's Soccer Tournament
Missouri Valley Conference Men's Soccer Tournament